The Minister of Information was the leader and most senior official of the French Ministry of Information. It was a position in the Government of France from 1938 to 1974 and no longer exists.

History 
Initially created under the name of Minister of Propaganda under the second government of Léon Blum, the office adopted the Information denomination with the following administrations until 1974, date to which it was definitely disestablished.

Powers and functions

Officeholders

Third Republic

Vichy France

Free France

Provisional Government

Fourth Republic

Fifth Republic

Notes

References 

Information
1938 establishments in France
1974 disestablishments in France
Information ministries
 

eo:Listo de francaj ministroj pri informado
fr:Liste des ministres français de l'Information
id:Daftar Menteri Penerangan Prancis